The 1982 Stockholm Open was a men's tennis tournament played on indoor hard courts and part of the 1982 Volvo Grand Prix and took place at the Kungliga tennishallen in Stockholm, Sweden. It was the 14th edition of the tournament and was held from 1 November through 7 November 1982. Fifteenth-seeded Henri Leconte won the singles title.

Finals

Singles

 Henri Leconte defeated  Mats Wilander, 7–6(7–4), 6–3

Doubles

 Mark Dickson /  Jan Gunnarsson defeated  Sherwood Stewart /  Ferdi Taygan, 7–6, 6–7, 6–4

References

External links
  
 ITF tournament edition details
 ATP tournament profile

Stockholm Open
Stockholm Open
Stockholm Open
Stockholm Open
1980s in Stockholm